The Arts and Culture Commission of Contra Costa County was approved by the County Board of Supervisors on December 13, 1994. After a search for candidates to fill nine positions on the Commission (five to represent each of the supervisorial districts and four to serve at-large), the supervisors appointed the commissioners by June 1995. The Commission held its first meeting on July 12, 1995. 

On March 29, 2022, Contra Costa County Board of Supervisors dissolved the Arts and Culture Commission of Contra Costa County.

External links
http://64.166.146.245/agenda_publish.cfm?id=&mt=ALL&get_month=3&get_year=2022&dsp=ag&seq=1949

Contra Costa
Contra Costa County, California